Wanderley Santos Monteiro Júnior, or simply Wanderley (born October 11, 1988 in Campinas), is a Brazilian forward who plays for Ponte Preta.

Career

Ponte Preta
Wanderley came through the youth ranks with Ponte Preta, and was called up to the senior squad for the 2006 Campeonato Paulista season. His performances in the tournament, scoring a total of three goals, second most in the team, earned him a new contract with the club. Despite being reassigned to the youth department, he still made 11 substitute appearances in 2006 Campeonato Brasileiro Série A, including a debut in the 3–2 win over Corinthians on 30 April 2006. In the 2008 Campeonato Brasileiro Série B he scored three goals in the first two months of the competition, causing Cruzeiro to show an interest and sign him on a three-year contract in July 2008, paying a fee to buy out the last year of his Ponte Preta contract. He finished his Ponte Preta career with 15 goals in 96 games in all competitions.

Cruzeiro
Wanderley was used sparingly as a substitute by Cruzeiro in 2008 Campeonato Brasileiro Série A, scoring his first goal for the club in the last round of the competition, against Portuguesa on 7 December 2008.

Santo Andre loan
In 2009 he again had little game time with Cruzeiro, and on 1 September he was loaned to Santo André. He scored on his debut in a 2–1 home defeat against Atlético Mineiro on 6 September 2009. Despite scoring four goals in his ten games, Santo Andre were relegated at the end of the season.

São Caetano loan
In January 2010 Wanderley was sent on loan to São Caetano until the end of the year. He scored five times in 22 games, as the club became runners-up in the competition.

Grêmio Prudente loan
In May 2010 Wanderley moved to Grêmio Prudente rather than see out his loan with São Caetano. He scored five times in 17 games in 2010 Campeonato Brasileiro Série A.

Flamengo
In January 2011, Wanderley signed a three-year contract with Flamengo. During the 2011 Campeonato Carioca season he competed for top scorer with his idol Ronaldinho, with both having score five goals by mid-March. His 2011 Campeonato Brasileiro Série A campaign lasted only six games until the end of June.

Qatar: Al-Arabi
On 6 July 2011 it was announced that Wanderley had signed for Qatar Stars League side Al-Arabi for a reported fee of R$2 million. He was given shirt number 33, which was the same he wore at Flamengo. He made his debut in the group stages of the 2011 Sheikh Jassim Cup on 15 August 2011, scoring twice in the 3–0 victory over Al-Wakrah. Nine days later he scored another brace, as his team won the final against Umm Salal. On 17 September 2011, in the first league game of the season, he suffered a cruciate ligament injury, requiring an operation, and keeping him out for the rest of the season. He returned to Brazil to recuperate. His third season in Qatar was his best, scoring 12 goals in 19 games.

United Arab Emirates: Al Sharjah
Wanderley signed for UAE Pro-League side Al-Sharjah ahead of the 2014–15 season, linking up with manager Paulo Bonamigo who he had played under at Ponte Preta. His 17 goals (from 25 games) made him third top scorer in the 2014–15 UAE Pro-League season. In the 2015–16 season he added another 15 goals, but despite having a year left on his contract, an approach from another UAE club led to doubled wage demands which Al-Sharjah couldn't meet, so he announced his intention to leave the club.

United Arab Emirates: Al-Nasr
In July 2016, Wanderley signed a three-year deal with Al-Nasr. His Al-Nasr career was soon marred by controversy. As a result of the ban he received from the Asian Football Confederation, Wanderley was de-registered from the Al-Nasr squad. He was reinstated in the January mid-season transfer window, at which point the UAE FA handed him an additional 10-match ban. He came back from this ban on 11 March 2017, scoring a stoppage-time penalty in the 4–0 win over Al Shabab.

Wanderley started the 2017–18 season keen to put the past behind him, but another knee injury in the third game of the campaign against Al-Jazira put him on the sidelines for a couple of months. He returned to play cup matches in December and January, but on 14 March 2018 he was released by the club.

Coritiba
Wanderley was without a club for the rest of 2018, suffering another knee injury, and was signed on 24 January 2019 by Coritiba, initially until the end of Campeonato Paranaense in April. He did not make his debut until 18 March. He scored his only goal of the campaign in the derby against Londrina, but was also injured in the game and missed the rest of the campaign. Despite this, his contract was extended for the 2019 Campeonato Brasileiro Série B season.

Career statistics

Passport controversy
In the summer of 2016 Wanderley has acquired an Indonesian passport, which would have made him the first player of Indonesian nationality in the history of UAE Pro-League. However, in September 2016 he was provisionally suspended by the AFC, after they became aware that his Indonesian passport was alleged to be fake. This had important consequences for Al Nasr, as they were forced to forfeit a match they had originally won 3–0 against El Jaish, in which Wanderley had scored two goals, and were eventually eliminated from the 2016 AFC Champions League. On 11 November 2016, at the AFC disciplinary committee, Wanderley and Al-Nasr admitted the use of falsified documents. Wanderley was given a three-month suspension, backdated to 2 September. When he returned from this suspension the UAE FA handed him an additional 10-match ban.

Honours
Flamengo
Taça Guanabara: 2011
Taça Rio: 2011
Rio de Janeiro State League: 2011

Al-Arabi
Sheikh Jassim Cup: 2011

References

External links

1988 births
Living people
Brazilian footballers
Brazilian expatriate footballers
Associação Atlética Ponte Preta players
Cruzeiro Esporte Clube players
Esporte Clube Santo André players
Associação Desportiva São Caetano players
CR Flamengo footballers
Al-Arabi SC (Qatar) players
Sharjah FC players
Al-Nasr SC (Dubai) players
Coritiba Foot Ball Club players
Expatriate footballers in Qatar
Qatar Stars League players
UAE Pro League players
Expatriate footballers in the United Arab Emirates
Association football forwards
Sportspeople from Campinas